Kamal Gurbanov (born on 12 July 1995) is an Azerbaijani professional footballer who plays as a right-back for Sabail in the Azerbaijan Premier League.

Club career
On 9 August 2015, Gurbanov made his debut in the Azerbaijan Premier League for Neftçi Baku against Kapaz.

References

External links
 

1994 births
Living people
Association football defenders
Azerbaijani footballers
Azerbaijan Premier League players
Neftçi PFK players
Sabail FK players